Richard Coleman (20 January 1930 – 16 December 2008) was a British film, television and stage actor.

Early life
Richard Coleman was born Ronald Coleman in Peckham, London in 1930. He was educated at Wilson's Grammar School, Peckham.  After three years' National Service in the R.A.F., he worked as a salesman in a West End gentleman's outfitters. While there he became interested in amateur dramatics, joining "The Taverners", a group which visited local inns and public houses, giving performances of Shakespeare. Bob and Frances Fish, who ran The Taverners, recognised Coleman's potential and entered him in 1951 for the Leverhulme Scholarship to RADA, which he won.  To make ends meet during the Academy's vacations, he was forced to do a variety of jobs, including working on the Thames River Bus and selling razors.  He graduated from RADA in 1953 with the Principal’s Medal. He adopted the stage name Richard Coleman, to avoid confusion with the film star Ronald Colman.
He then spent two years with the Worthing Repertory Company, appearing in many plays.

Career

Theatre
Coleman made his professional acting debut in 1955, playing Albert Tufnell, A.B., in the stage adaptation of Sailor Beware!starring Peggy Mount, which opened in The Strand Theatre in London's West End on Wednesday 16 February 1955 and ran for 1231 performances. He also appeared in The World of Suzie Wong, The Big Killing, A Murder is Announced, The Mousetrap and had three years from 1968-70 playing both Andrew Hunter and Robert Danvers in the London West End stage version of There's a Girl in My Soup.  Later in his career Coleman became a theatre producer and, among other ventures, toured Canada in 1976 with a well-received production of "Absurd Person Singular", starring John Thaw.

A full list of the plays in which Coleman appeared is:

1955-58     Sailor, Beware! (Albert Tufnell, A.B.)

1959        Suzie Wong (Ben Jeffcoat)

1962        The Big Killing

1968-70     There's A Girl in My Soup (Andrew Hunter and Robert Danvers)

1975        How It Can Ruin Your Health

1975        Cheaper by the Dozen

1976        Absurd Person Singular (Tour of Canada)

1976        The Roaring Forties (George)

1977        The Chiltern Hundreds (Beecham)

1977        A Murder is Announced

1978        Suddenly At Home (Glenn Howard)

1979        An Ideal Husband (Sir Robert Chiltern)

1982        Public Relations

1982        In Praise of Love.

He also appeared in: Lady Windermere's Fan (Lord Windermere), Staircase (Charles Dyer), The Mousetrap, Two and Two Make Sex and Not Now Darling.

Television
He played David Redway in the situation comedy ...And Mother Makes Three (1972-3), and its sequel ...And Mother Makes Five (1974-6), opposite Wendy Craig. Other television roles included Nick Allardyce in The Adventures of Ben Gunn (1958), Alan-a-Dale in The Adventures of Robin Hood (1958–60), and Jack Royston in the soap opera Weavers Green (1966). Coleman also made guest appearances in television series such as Dixon of Dock Green, No Hiding Place, Emergency Ward 10, Sergeant Cork, Zero One, The Avengers, Z-Cars, Thriller (A Coffin for the Bride), Robin's Nest, Surgical Spirit, Champion House, "Letters From The Dead", Whodunnit? (Worth Dying For) (1975), and Virtual Murder.  He was a panellist on "Whose Baby?" (1973) in all 13 episodes of the first series and all 14 episodes of the second series.

Film
Coleman appeared in a number films including The Dam Busters (1955), Yangtse Incident (1957), Girls at Sea (1958), The Navy Lark (1959), Ben-Hur (1959), Hell is a City (1960), The Day The Earth Caught Fire (1961), 80,000 Suspects (1963), Rotten to the Core (1965) Naked Evil (1966) and Who Dares Wins (1982).  He also had a cameo role in the film 10 Rillington Place (1971) as the police constable who arrests John Christie.

Personal life
Coleman was married to the actress Peggy Sinclair.  They had two daughters.   At the end of the 1980s they went to live in rural France, where he indulged his lifelong love of dogs, good food and fine wine. He died from cancer in France on 16 December 2008, aged 78.

Filmography

References

External links
 

1930 births
2008 deaths
English male television actors
English male film actors
English male stage actors
People from Peckham
Alumni of RADA
Deaths from cancer in France